Shoolagiri is a large village and Taluk in the Krishnagiri district of Tamil Nadu. It lies along National Highway 7, and is overlooked by a hill with three peaks.

Shoolagiri's name is derived from Hill, which is like Trident (Threesulam) and Shoolagiri is a cosmopolitan town with a mix of linguistic groups. Tamil is the official and spoken language, however there are also a significant number of Telugu and Kannada speakers in the town.

Demographics
As of the 2011 Census, Shoolagiri had population of 9,530. There are 1,218 children aged 6 or under, which is 12.78% of the village population.  The literacy rate was 77.03%, lower than the Tamil Nadu state average of 80.09%.

References

Cities and towns in Krishnagiri district